Nataliya Lehonkova (born 27 December 1982) is a Ukrainian marathon runner.

Biography 
Lehonkova was born in the Kazakh SSR, Soviet Union (now Kazakhstan) but in 1998 moved to Berezhany, Ukraine, the native city of her mother. She is a student of the spiritual master Sri Chinmoy since 1995. She adopted the name Samunnati from Sri Chinmoy  (a Sanskrit word represents height, exseltation, dignity and prosperity). Lehonkova ran her first marathon aged 16  and won the 2013 Belfast Marathon, 2015 Dublin Marathon and 2016 Los Angeles Marathon. She finished 87th at the Olympics Women's marathon in Rio 2016.

Races and Results

References

External links

 Official Website
 Facebook Account
 Video: Samunnati on meditation and running, SC TV, 2017
 Video: Los Angeles Marathon, 2016
 Video: Rotterdam Marathon, 2021

1982 births
Living people
Devotees of Sri Chinmoy
Ukrainian female marathon runners
Ukrainian people of Kazakhstani descent
Athletes (track and field) at the 2016 Summer Olympics
Olympic athletes of Ukraine